FC Horses or also FC Horses Veľké Úľany was a Slovak football team, based in the town of Veľké Úľany. The club was founded in 1928. FC Horses were the third team of FC Spartak Trnava until summer 2016.

Club history
1928 – FC Horses Šúrovce
2014 – FC Spartak Trnava C
2016 – FC Horses

References

External links 
FC Horses at Futbalnet portal 
at surovce-sport.sk 
at TRNAVSKÝ HLAS 

Football clubs in Slovakia
Association football clubs established in 1928
1928 establishments in Slovakia